Park County School District #6 is a public school district based in Cody, Wyoming, United States.

Geography
Park County School District #6 serves central and southwestern portions of Park County, including the following communities:

Incorporated places
City of Cody
Unincorporated places
Wapiti

Schools

Secondary schools
Grades 9-12
Cody High School
Grades 6-8
Cody Middle School

Elementary schools
Grades K-5
Eastside Elementary School
Glenn Livingston Elementary School
Sunset Elementary School
Valley Elementary School
Wapiti Elementary School

Student demographics
The following figures are as of October 1, 2009.

Total District Enrollment: 2,156
Student enrollment by gender
Male: 1,065 (49.40%)
Female: 1,091 (50.60%)
Student enrollment by ethnicity
American Indian or Alaska Native: 9 (0.42%)
Asian: 13 (0.60%)
Black or African American: 8 (0.37%)
Hispanic or Latino: 85 (3.94%)
Two or More Races: 12 (0.56%)
White: 2,029 (94.11%)

See also
List of school districts in Wyoming

References

External links
Park County School District #6 - Official site.

School districts in Wyoming
Education in Park County, Wyoming